Lone Tree Township may refer to:

 Lone Tree Township, Clay County, Iowa
 Lone Tree Township, McPherson County, Kansas
 Lone Tree Township, Chippewa County, Minnesota
 Lone Tree Township, Clay County, Nebraska
 Lone Tree Township, Merrick County, Nebraska
 Lone Tree Township, Golden Valley County, North Dakota, in Golden Valley County, North Dakota
 Lone Tree Township, Charles Mix County, South Dakota, in Charles Mix County, South Dakota
 Lone Tree Township, Perkins County, South Dakota, in Perkins County, South Dakota
 Lone Tree Township, Tripp County, South Dakota, in Tripp County, South Dakota

Township name disambiguation pages